Push Kashan (also Romanized as Pūsh Kashān, Pesh Kashun, Pīshkashān, and Pīshkoshūn) is a village in Silakhor Rural District, Silakhor District, Dorud County, Lorestan Province, Iran. At the 2006 census, its population was 424, in 91 families.

References 

Towns and villages in Dorud County